Major General Michael Joseph Nardotti Jr., USA (born April 30, 1947) is an American lawyer and retired Army officer. He served as the Judge Advocate General of the United States Army from 1993 to 1997.  He is a 1969 graduate of the United States Military Academy with a B.S. degree and received his J.D. degree from Fordham University in 1976.  Nardotti is a partner at the law firm of Squire Patton Boggs, serving as the co-managing partner of the Washington, D.C. office.

Awards and decorations

Nardotti was inducted into the U.S. Army Ranger Hall of Fame in 2006.

Gallery

References

1947 births
Living people
People from Brooklyn
United States Military Academy alumni
Military personnel from New York City
United States Army Rangers
United States Army personnel of the Vietnam War
Recipients of the Air Medal
Recipients of the Silver Star
Fordham University School of Law alumni
Recipients of the Meritorious Service Medal (United States)
United States Army generals
Recipients of the Distinguished Service Medal (US Army)
Judge Advocates General of the United States Army
People associated with Squire Patton Boggs